The phrase milk run originated in World War II, when United States Army Air Corps and Royal Air Force aircrews used it to describe a mission with little danger.

Other sources show the term "milk run" to be in use in rural areas of the American Upper Midwest as early as 1917, where it was used to describe a train that made frequent stops to pick up farmers' milk cans for shipment to local dairies for processing and bottling. The Macmillan online dictionary describes the American usage as "an airplane or train trip with stops at many places." In this context, the term was popularly used to describe a slow, tedious trip. The same entry describes a somewhat different British usage: "a regular trip during which nothing unusual happens, especially by airplane."

History
In American urban culture, a milk run came to describe the distribution of milk bottles by the milkman. On his daily route, the milkman simultaneously distributed the full bottles and collected the empty bottles from a previous delivery and would then return with the empty bottles back to the starting point.

In the context of logistics, according to Winfrid Meusel, milk runs were any routes that originated by identifying potential circular tours, whereby the utilization of trucks could be increased and logistics costs could be reduced.

Airline routes

In the airline industry, "milk run" has been used to describe multi-stop, regularly-scheduled flights by a single aircraft. Current examples include:

 Several Alaska Airlines routes connecting smaller Alaskan cities to Juneau, Anchorage, Fairbanks and Seattle.

 The Rex Airlines Milk Run in Queensland, Australia.

 United Airlines tri-weekly Island Hopper service from Honolulu to Guam via Chuuk, Kosrae, Pohnpei, Kwajalein and Majuro.

References

Logistics
Aviation in World War II
Commercial aviation
Rail transportation in the United States
Metaphors referring to food and drink
Milk